was a Japanese waka poet of the mid-Heian period.

Biography 

In 1017, she joined to the court and served as a lady-in-waiting for Grand Empress Dowager Shoshi, the mother of Emperor Go-Icjijo. 

She bore him a girl. She also served as the nurse of Imperial Princess Teishi and Emperor Go-Reizei. 

When Emperor Go-Reizei ascended the throne, she was promoted.

Poetry 
Thirty-seven or thirty-eight of her poems were included in imperial anthologies from the Goshūi Wakashū onward.

One of her poems was included as the fifty-eighth in the Ogura Hyakunin Isshu:

Possible partial authorship of The Tale of Genji 
Some scholars have attributed the final ten chapters of her mother's magnum opus, The Tale of Genji, to her.

References

Bibliography

External links
List of her poems in the International Research Center for Japanese Studies's online waka database.
Daini no Sanmi on Kotobank (in Japanese).

11th century in Japan
11th-century Japanese poets
Japanese women poets
Ladies-in-waiting of Heian-period Japan
Hyakunin Isshu poets